Letitia Cross (1681/1682 – 4 April 1737) was a British singer and actor. She appeared at the Drury Lane Theatre and was the mistress of Peter the Great when he visited England.

Life
Cross was born in Surrey and it has been suggested that this was 1681 or 1682 based on later information she volunteered. She was brought up in the theatre by her mother and her grandparents may have been Leonard and Ann Cross. She was baptised in Dorking.

In 1694 whilst still a child she was a member of the Drury Lane/Dorset Garden theatre company in London. At that time it was the only theatre company but a group left which included Thomas Betterton. She sang songs by Henry Purcell whilst he was still alive as well as appearing in his unfinished opera The Indian Queen after his death. She sang in The Mock Marriage, The Rival Sisters and a version of The Tempest by John Dryden.

She sang in various other productions and in 1696 she appeared as herself in a satire and later in that year she was in The Relapse by John Vanbrugh.

In 1697 and 1698 Peter the Great embarked on his Grand Embassy. He visited London and Cross became his mistress. She was paid £500 as "a present" although she expected more. The Czar replied that he thought her overpaid. Later that same year she went to France with a "certain baronet".

In 1705 Thomas Clayton opened Arsinoe which was said to be the first English Opera designed "in the Italian style". Cross who had only recently returned to Drury Lane was amongst its principal players. The following month she was in Florimel and The Tender Husband in April. In 1706 she married Peter Weir but he was soon killed in Flanders. Cross created new roles such as Miranda in Susanna Centlivre's successful comedy play The Busy Body in 1709 which ran for 13 nights. The following year the Drury Lane Theatre became, after much disagreement, subject to new management by Robert Wilks, Colley Cibber and Thomas Doggett and they refused to honour a five-year contract she had signed the year before with the previous management. The management had to change their minds when 73 of her admirers signed a petition in her support. She was accused of orchestrating the scheme but she denied any complicity.

Cross had a benefit in 1732 where she returned to the stage for one night. She died at her home in Leicester Fields in London on 4 April 1737 leaving shares in the Lincoln's Inn Fields theatre and several mourning rings. There was a painting of her by Sir Godfrey Kneller as St Catherine in the 1690s and a matching print by John Smith.

References

1680s births
1737 deaths
Actresses from London
Actresses from Surrey
17th-century English actresses
18th-century British actresses
British stage actresses
18th-century British women singers
Singers from London
Musicians from Surrey
18th-century English women
Mistresses of Peter the Great